Albert "Bert" Henderson (1931–2008) was a Scottish football player and manager. Henderson attended Aberdeen Grammar School before going on to play for Dundee and St Mirren.

Henderson helped Dundee win the 1952–53 Scottish League Cup. He was transferred to St Mirren in 1961 for £2,000, but a knee injury curtailed his playing career a year later. He then became manager of Arbroath in October 1962, a position he held until January 1980. Arbroath twice won promotion to Division One during his time in charge, spending a total of four seasons in the top flight of the Scottish football league system.

References

1931 births
2008 deaths
Association football inside forwards
Dundee F.C. players
St Mirren F.C. players
Scottish Football League players
Arbroath F.C. managers
Scottish Football League managers
Date of birth missing
Date of death missing
Place of birth missing
Place of death missing
Scottish footballers
Scottish football managers